Sergei Olegovich Lisiev (born 4 June 1993) is a Russian pair skater. With former partner Tatiana Tudvaseva, he qualified for the 2011–12 Junior Grand Prix Final and finished 6th. They were coached by Ludmila Kalinina and Alexei Menshikov in Saransk, after previously training in Perm region.

Programs 
(with Tudvaseva)

Competitive highlights

With Borisova

With Tudvaseva

References

External links 

 
 Tatiana Tudvaseva / Sergei Lisiev at sport-folio.net
 Sergei Olegovich Lisiev at fskate.ru 

Russian male pair skaters
1993 births
Living people
People from Novouralsk
Sportspeople from Sverdlovsk Oblast